Peter David Ebdon (born 27 August 1970) is an English former snooker player. The winner of the 2002 World Snooker Championship, Ebdon won nine world ranking events, placing twelfth on the all-time list of ranking tournament winners. In addition to his world snooker championship, Ebdon won a second Triple Crown event at the 2006 UK Championship.

After winning the 1990 IBSF World Under-21 Snooker Championship, Ebdon turned professional, making his debut at the World Snooker Championship the following year. He won his first professional event at the 1993 Grand Prix and reached the elite top 16 players in the world rankings in 1995. He reached his first World Championship final in 1996, where he lost to Stephen Hendry, however, he reached the final again in 2002 World Snooker Championship, defeating Hendry 18–17. He reached a third World Championship final in 2006, losing to Graeme Dott. Ebdon continued in the top 16 until 2011, reaching the last of his 18 ranking event finals at the 2018 Paul Hunter Classic. On 30 April 2020, Ebdon announced his retirement from the game citing a neck injury after being a professional for 29 seasons.

Known for his intense and often controversial slow play, Ebdon made 377 competitive century breaks and two maximum breaks during his career, reaching a height of third in the world rankings for two seasons.

Career

Amateur career
From the mid-1980s, Ebdon took part in various amateur tournaments and quickly became one of the leading amateurs of his time. He won the 1990 IBSF World Under-21 Snooker Championship defeating Oliver King 11–9 in the final.

World Champion (1991–2002)
In 1991, Ebdon became a professional player. He beat Steve Davis 10–4 in the first round of the 1992 World Championship and would go on to reach the quarter-finals of the event, losing 7–13 to Terry Griffiths. This earned him the WPBSA Young Player of the Year award, awarded by the WPBSA (World Professional Billiards and Snooker Association) . His first ranking title was the 1993 Grand Prix, defeating Ken Doherty 9–6 in the final. In 1995, he reached the final of the 1995 UK Championship, his first Triple Crown final, losing 3–10 to Stephen Hendry. He rose the world rankings to be in the elite top 16 in 1995, and his career-highest place of third in 1996. He again reached world number three status at the close of the 2002 season.

Ebdon reached his first World Snooker Championship final at the 1996 event, losing 12–18 to Hendry. He won the 1997 Thailand Open, defeating Nigel Bond 9–7, the 2000 British Open defeating Jimmy White 9–6 and the 2001 Scottish Open, defeating Doherty 9–7 before he reached another World Championship final.

Six years after his first World Championship final, Ebdon defeated Michael Judge, Joe Perry, Anthony Hamilton and Matthew Stevens to reach the final again at the 2002 World Snooker Championship. In a rematch against Hendry, Ebdon won his only world title, completing a victory in a  18–17. Having started the tournament at odds of 33–1 he commented "It's what I have been working for and dreaming about for the last 17 years... I wasn't ready to win it six years ago, but I've improved as a player and as a person". He also reached the final for a third time at the 2006 World Snooker Championship, where he played Graeme Dott. Trailing 7–15 coming into the final session, Ebdon won six successive frames before Dott prevailed 18–14. In the semi-final before the final he led Marco Fu 15–9 before being pegged back to 16–16 before Ebdon took the deciding frame.

Post World Championship win (2002–2011)
Ebdon's shot duration slowed considerably over a period of time, which attracted some criticism – particularly in his match against Ronnie O'Sullivan in the 2005 World Championship. Resuming at 6–10 down, Ebdon won the first six frames of the evening session, at one stage taking three minutes over a shot, and five minutes to compile a break of 12. Ebdon nevertheless won the match 13–11. Such performances, though lacking fluency, often appeared to break his opponent mentally. Ebdon stated after his victory over O'Sullivan, "When I'm trying my hardest I seem to go slow. I don't do it intentionally". When The Times described his slow play as "cheating", he sued for libel.

One of Ebdon's achievements was winning the 2006 UK Championship, beating Stephen Hendry 10–6 in the final. He became only the ninth player to win both the World and UK championships. Ebdon's shot times were markedly quicker, which served him well in defeating the defending champion Ding Junhui and John Higgins en route to the final, gaining eight century breaks over the course of the tournament, but failed to reach a ranking quarter-final the next year in 2007. His poor form extended into 2008; in the Northern Ireland Trophy he lost 0–5 to Liang Wenbo with a highest break of 32, a result which caused the Gambling Commission to investigate over unusual betting patterns, but no investigations were initiated by the WPBSA. In 2009, Ebdon beat John Higgins 10–8 to win the China Open. In the subsequent World Championship of that year, Ebdon lost 5–10 to Nigel Bond in the first round. After a disappointing season, Ebdon once again lost 5–10 in the 2010 World Championship, this time to Graeme Dott. This result meant Ebdon dropped out of the top 16 in the world rankings after an uninterrupted 16-year stay.

At the start of the 2010 season Ebdon issued a statement announcing that he would not be able to play to the best of his ability. He enjoyed a good return of form in the World Open, losing against Ronnie O'Sullivan 1–3 in the semi-final. This was his first semi-final since the 2009 China Open and saw him retake a place in the top 16. However, he was knocked out in the first rounds of both the 2010 UK Championship and World Championship, but was still ranked as number 13 at the end of the season.

Fall from the top 16 (2011–15)
Beginning in 2011, Ebdon fell off the top 16 at the first cut-off in October, meaning he now had to win a qualifying match to reach the main draw of the ranking events. He lost his first qualifying match in an attempt to reach the 2011 UK Championship, being defeated 3–6 by Robert Milkins. This loss meant that Ebdon would not play in the UK Championship since his first year as a professional in 1991. He also missed the Masters for the first time since 1992, due to being ranked outside of the top 16. At the PTC series, he played in all 12 events but only won 4 matches all season. He finished 98th in the Order of Merit and these results contributed to Ebdon being ranked world number 28 in March 2012.

Despite his fall in rank, Ebdon won the China Open, which saw him rise seven places in the rankings to number 21. During the final he recorded his 300th century break. He made six century breaks during the tournament, the most of any player – four of which were in the final. He continued his surge of form into the World Championship by recording a 10–0 whitewash over Alfie Burden in qualifying. However, his season was ended when he drew O'Sullivan in the first round and lost 4–10. Despite his win in China, Ebdon finished the season ranked world number 20 meaning he had dropped 7 places during the year.

Ebdon began the season by qualifying for the Wuxi Classic and lost 4–5 to an in-form Stuart Bingham in the first round. He then played in the Australian Goldfields Open, beating Michael Holt, Ding Junhui and Shaun Murphy all by 5–4 scorelines. The match against Ding Junhui caused some controversy as Ebdon had taken an average of 32 seconds a shot in a nine frame encounter lasting almost 5 hours. In the semi-finals he defeated Marco Fu 6–2, despite his opponent having over a 90% pot success, 80% long pot success and 80% in his safety game success. He faced Barry Hawkins in the final and succumbed to a 3–9 defeat, admitting afterwards that he had struggled in every department of his game. Ebdon lost in the first round of the Shanghai Masters, but continued his good start to the season at the inaugural International Championship. He received a bye through the first round as Stephen Lee had been suspended due to match-fixing allegations, and only conceded one frame in beating Stephen Maguire and Ricky Walden to advance to the semi-finals. There he was defeated 1–9 by Judd Trump.

During the rest of the season Ebdon failed to qualify for three ranking events and in the first round of the World Open and the China Open. He qualified for the World Championship by coming back from 6–8 to beat Kurt Maflin 10–8 and played Graeme Dott in the first round, a repeat of the 2006 final. His place in the main draw meant Ebdon equalled Steve Davis by featuring in 22 consecutive appearances in the tournament, second only to Stephen Hendry's record of 27. His match against Dott lasted seven hours, spread over three sessions as Ebdon battled back from 2–6 to level at 6–6, before losing the last four frames to succumb to a 6–10 defeat. Dott called for new rules to be brought in to combat slow play after the match. Ebdon fell 10 places in the end of season rankings to world number 30.

Ebdon's 22-year run of playing at the world championship was ended at the 2014 World Snooker Championship, losing 8–10 against Finland's Robin Hull to miss the event for the first time since turning professional. He missed out on playing in the World Championship again in 2015 for the second year in a row as Stuart Carrington beat him 10–7 in the second qualifying round.

Later career and retirement (2015–present)
At the 2015 UK Championship, Ebdon beat Lu Chenwei 6–0, Dominic Dale 6–5 and reigning world champion Stuart Bingham 6–3 to reach the fourth round, where he lost 2–6 to David Grace. At 45, he was the oldest man in the field at the World Grand Prix, but knocked out Neil Robertson 4–3, before Ding Junhui whitewashed him 0–4 in the second round. Ebdon eliminated James Wattana 10–6 in the first round of World Championship qualifying, and then came back from 3–9 behind against Gerard Greene to win 10–9 just after 2am. He qualified for the first time in three years by defeating Ian Burns 10–2 and lost 2–10 to Marco Fu in the opening round.

Ebdon was victorious over Zhou Yuelong, Duane Jones, and Dominic Dale to advance to the quarter-finals of the Indian Open, where he lost 3–4 to Nigel Bond. He made his 24th appearance at the World Championship after beating Michael Holt 10–9 on the final black to qualify. He recovered from a position of requiring four snookers, to win the 9th frame of his first round match against Stuart Bingham on a re-spotted black, and only trailed 4–5 overnight; however, he was ultimately defeated 5–10. Ebdon ended the season outside the top 32 in the world rankings for the first time since 1992, as he was ranked 40th.

Ebdon appeared in his last ranking event final at the 2018 Paul Hunter Classic. It was his 18th final, facing Kyren Wilson for the title, but lost 2–4. Ebdon announced his retirement from the sport on 30 April 2020, citing neck injuries. In 2021, Ebdon became mentor to Jack Lisowski. The following year, Lisowski reached his first ever World Championship quarter final, who credited Ebdon's mentorship for his improved performance.

Status

Ebdon was only the third player to have made two competitive maximum 147 breaks in professional tournament play – these coming at the Strachan Professional and UK Championship, both in 1992. In the same year, he became the first player to make four centuries in five frames. During the 2012 Australian Goldfields Open world number two Judd Trump labelled Ebdon's playing style as "a joke" after his second round 5–4 win over Ding Junhui took almost 5 hours to be completed. The average time between shots was over 30 seconds and the average frame time was 32 minutes. 
Ebdon is also colour blind. In a frame in which the brown ball is in close proximity to a red, he usually asks the referee for help on which ball is which. During a match against Simon Bedford in the 2008 Grand Prix, Ebdon inadvertently potted the brown believing it to be a red. He made the same mistake in the final of the 2012 Australian Goldfields Open and again in the 2015 Indian Open.

Ebdon instituted a strict fitness regime to be fit for snooker, including swimming one mile every day. To improve sporting performance, in 2012, Ebdon adopted a vegan diet. In his first year of following the diet he lost two and a half stone (35 lbs, 15.9 kg) and for September aimed to eat only raw food. He is a devotee of Napoleon Hill's motivational book Think and Grow Rich. Ebdon was criticised by other players on the professional circuit for his exuberant outpourings of emotion after winning important frames or matches, with Ronnie O'Sullivan calling him a 'psycho'.

Personal life

Ebdon was born in the Islington district of London, and later moved to Wellingborough, Northamptonshire. He started his career while at Highbury Grove School, resulting in him not taking his O levels – a decision he now regrets. In 2005, he emigrated with his wife Deborah and four children: Ruby Mae, Ethan, Tristan and Clarissa, to Dubai and lived there until 2009. On 22 January 2009, it was revealed that Ebdon had split from his wife by mutual consent. In 2010 he married Nora, who is Hungarian. In 2018, Ebdon became a professional 'Healer' at The College of Healing in Malvern, Worcestershire, England. He is also involved with sourcing mares for stallion Harbours Law at the Batsford Stud in Gloucestershire. Ebdon has also released three singles.

Performance and rankings timeline

Career finals
Below is a list of professional finals contested by Ebdon.

Ranking finals: 18 (9 titles)

Non-ranking finals: 6 (4 titles)

Pro-am finals: 5 (4 titles)

Team finals: 1 (1 title)

Amateur finals: 1 (1 title)

References

External links

Peter Ebdon at worldsnooker.com
 Player Profile on Pro Snooker
 Player Profile on BBC Sport
 Profile on Yahoo! Sport
 Peter Ebdon

1970 births
Living people
Snooker players from London
Sportspeople from Kettering
UK champions (snooker)
Winners of the professional snooker world championship